California State University, East Bay (Cal State East Bay, CSU East Bay, or CSUEB) is a public university in Hayward, California. The university is part of the California State University system and offers 136 undergraduate and 60 post-baccalaureate areas of study. Founded in 1957, California State University, East Bay has a student body of almost 14,000. As of Fall 2021, it had 863 faculty, of whom 358 (41%) were on the tenure track. The university's largest and oldest college campus is located in Hayward, with additional campus-sites in the nearby cities of Oakland and Concord.

With multiple campuses across the East Bay region of the San Francisco Bay Area, the school changed its name from California State University, Hayward to its present name in 2005. Cal State East Bay is a Hispanic-serving institution and an Asian American and Native American Pacific Islander-Serving Institution.

History 
The university was established as State College for Alameda County (Alameda State College), with its primary mission to serve the higher education needs of both Alameda County and Contra Costa County. Its construction was part of the California Master Plan for Higher Education as proposed by Clark Kerr and the original site for the school was Pleasanton, California. The campus was moved to Hayward before plans were finalized due to the efforts of State Assembly member Carlos Bee and other boosters from the Hayward community, including S.E. Bond Jr, and E. Guy Warren, namesake of Warren Hall. At the time of its opening in 1959, classes were first held on the campus of Sunset High School and then Hayward High School. With the addition of the school, higher education in the San Francisco Bay Area became more accessible. To the south was San Jose State College (now San Jose State University) serving the South Bay counties. To the west was San Francisco State College (now San Francisco State University) serving San Francisco and San Mateo Counties. To the north is Sonoma State University, serving Marin, Napa and Sonoma counties. Chabot College, a part of the California Community College system, opened nearby in Hayward in 1961.

The university has undergone numerous transitions in its history, making name changes accordingly. In 1961, the school was moved to its present location in the Hayward Hills and renamed Alameda County State College. In 1963, the name was changed to California State College at Hayward. The school was granted university status in 1972, changing its name to California State University, Hayward. In 2005, the university implemented a new, broader mission to serve the eastern San Francisco Bay Area and adopted the name California State University, East Bay. The proposal to rename the campus to California State University, East Bay was approved by the California State University Board of Trustees on January 26, 2005.

Presidents 
Cathy Sandeen, an Oakland native and alumnus of two other California State University institutions: Humboldt State University (B.S. in Speech Pathology summa cum laude) and San Francisco State University (M.A. in Broadcast & Electronic Communication Arts), became the sixth president of CSU East Bay on January 4, 2021, following the announcement of her appointment to the position by the Board of Trustees on October, 29, 2020. She previously served as chancellor of the University of Alaska Anchorage (UAA). Prior to her time at UAA, Sandeen served as chancellor of the University of Wisconsin Colleges and University of Wisconsin-Extension from 2014 to 2018. In that role, she served as leader and chief administrator and was responsible for the academic, financial and administrative activities of two statewide higher education institutions.

List of former presidents 
 Fred F. Harcleroad (1959–1967)
 Ellis E. McCune (1967–1990)
 Norma S. Rees (1990–2006)
 Mohammad H. Qayoumi (2006–2011)
 Leroy M. Morishita (2011–2020)

Campus 

The school's main campus is located in Hayward, California on a plateau east of the Hayward fault that overlooks the southeast part of the city. CSUEB also has a campus in Concord, California in Contra Costa County, and a professional development center in Oakland. Continuing education programs are available at all three locations.

For 40 years, Warren Hall was CSUEB's signature building; the building was visible from cities throughout the San Francisco Bay Area and served as a landmark for Hayward and the surrounding Eastern San Francisco Bay Area. Warren Hall was rated the least earthquake-safe building in the California State University system by the CSU Seismic Review Board. In January 2013 the CSU Board of Trustees authorized $50 million to demolish the former administrative building and replace it with a new structure. Warren Hall was demolished by implosion on August 17, 2013. Construction for the new 67,000 square foot-building began in November 2013, and doors opened in December 2015 on the completed structure.

California State University, East Bay is also known for its Solar Energy Project. Solar panels were installed on four campus rooftops and are used to generate supplemental power during peak periods and is one of the largest photovoltaic systems in Northern California. Since its completion in 2004 the university has received recognition on a regional and national level for the project; those include:
 A $3.4 million rebate from PG&E, the largest rebate issued to date for solar power installation
 The 2004 Business Environmental Achievement Award from the Hayward City Council
 The 2004 Green Power Leadership Award at the National Green Power Marketing Conference
 A 2005 Exceptional Project Award from the Western Council of Construction Consumers

On April 8, 2010, the California Public Utilities Commission approved a fuel cell project of Pacific Gas and Electric Company (PG&E) allowing Cal State East Bay's Hayward campus to become one of the first college campuses in Northern California to have a fuel cell. Once installed, the waste heat generated by the fuel cell will be converted into hot water to be used in campus buildings.

Since 2004, the Pioneer Amphitheatre on campus has been home of the KBLX Stone Soul Picnic, a day-long festival of R&B, soul and Urban Adult Contemporary music. Featured performers have included Ronald Isley, The Whispers, Teena Marie, Rick James, and The O'Jays. California State University, East Bay's Associated Student Incorporated also hosts concerts with artists like Lupe Fiasco and Goapele.

In 2005, Cal State East Bay began to build three new facilities: the Wayne and Gladys Valley Business and Technology Center (VBT), the Pioneer Heights student housing expansion and the University Union annex. The  VBT center was dedicated on in February 2007, making it the first new academic building on the Hayward Campus in more than 30 years. The building houses programs in business, technology management, engineering, multimedia, science, and online degree programs. An expansion to Pioneer Heights was dedicated in fall 2008. Student housing was able to accommodate more than 450 new residents and offer a  dining commons. An annex to the existing University Union opened in January 2007.

Construction continued with the anticipated dedication of the new Student Services and Administration building in Summer 2010 and the Recreation and Wellness Center in Fall 2010.

The campus is home to the C. E. Smith Museum of Anthropology, created in 1975. The museum, open to the public, has rotating exhibits, and archives including records of 18 Bay Area archaeological sites.

Academics 

The university is best known for its College of Business and Economics; a strong Education Department, where a large percentage of California teachers receive their certification; and the thriving Music Department where the California State University, East Bay Jazz Ensemble, directed by Dave Eshelman (retired June 2007), holds annual performances in Yoshi's at Jack London Square in Oakland and frequently tours Europe and parts of South America. The Biotechnology Program developed at California State University, East Bay affords the university a status as the center of research and development in the Life sciences, Bioinformatics and technologies for the Eastern San Francisco Bay Area.

California State University, East Bay also participates in the Internet2 project, a collaboration led by over 200 U.S. universities, private industries, and governments to develop advanced network technologies for research and higher education in the 21st century.

California State University, East Bay offers 48 undergraduate degree programs and 34 Master's degree programs in addition to its teaching credential program. The university also has a doctoral program in Educational Leadership (Ed.D.) held in cooperation with the University of California, Berkeley, San Francisco State University and San José State University. The most popular undergraduate majors are: Business administration, Psychology, Health science, Kinesiology, Criminal justice, Biological sciences, Sociology, Computer science, Human development, Fine art.

The five most popular majors for 2019 graduates.
 Business Administration and Management, General at 21%
 Health Professions and Related Programs at 16%
 Social Sciences at 10%
 Psychology, General at 10%
 Family and Consumer Economics and Related Services, Other at 6%

The academic departments of the university are organized into four colleges. Two of these are Liberal Arts colleges,
College of Letters, Arts, and Social Sciences (CLASS)
College of Science

and two of these are vocational colleges:
College of Business and Economics
College of Education and Allied Studies (CEAS)

First year students are put into Freshman Learning Communities which help students to:
earn higher GPAs
develop superior writing and communication skills
graduate reliably in four years.

Rankings

Student life 

The university's Department of Communications publishes a weekly newspaper called The Pioneer, its name referring to the school mascot, Pioneer Pete. The paper is staffed by faculty and students. East Bay is a diverse state university as indicated by the annual headcount report. As of fall 2018 CSU East Bay has the largest enrollment percentage of Filipino Americans, the second largest enrollment percentage of Pacific Islanders, African Americans and non-residents in the Cal State system.

Associated Students Incorporated
Associated Students Incorporated (ASI) is a student-run and student-owned organization that represents the student body at California State University, East Bay. Elected by the California State University, East Bay student body, the 15-member ASI Board of Directors is the governing body of Associated Students, Inc. The Board makes policy and oversees the fiscal responsibility of ASI. Additionally, the Board assists the university in planning, implementing, and evaluating campus programs, events, and curriculum. ASI currently has four departments: ASI Presents, ASI Business Office, Student Government, and the Early Childhood Education Center. In 2007 the university administration did not allow ASI to hold a student referendum on increasing student fees to fund a recreation and wellness center. It substituted 'alternative consultation'. In 2008, the administration again did not allow ASI to hold a referendum on increasing student fees to fund athletic scholarship for a move to Division II sports. Again, it substituted 'alternative consultation'.

Greek letter organizations

Fraternities
ΑΚΩ (Alpha Kappa Omega, Alpha chapter)
ΔΧ (Delta Chi, Hayward chapter)
ΓΖΑ (Gamma Zeta Alpha, Tau chapter)
ΛΘΦ (Lambda Theta Phi, Gamma Omicron chapter)
ΣΔΥ (Sigma Delta Upsilon, Hayward chapter)
TKE (Tau Kappa Epsilon, Upsilon Psi chapter)
ΖΩ  (Zeta Omega, Alpha chapter)

Sororities
ΑΚΟ (Alpha Kappa Omicron, Beta chapter)
ΑΦ (Alpha Phi, Eta Delta chapter)
ΛΣΓ (Lambda Sigma Gamma, Alpha Beta chapter)
ΛΘΑ (Lambda Theta Alpha, Zeta Zeta chapter)
ΛΘΝ (Lambda Theta Nu, Alpha Tau chapter)
ΚΞ (Kappa Xi) (Alpha chapter)
ΣΣΣ (Sigma Sigma Sigma, Epsilon Alpha chapter)
ΘΛΨ (Theta Lambda Psi, Alpha chapter)

Co-ed fraternities
ΑΦΩ (Alpha Phi Omega, Omicron Zeta chapter)
ΔΣΠ (Delta Sigma Pi, Zeta Tau chapter)

NPHC
ΑΚΑ (Alpha Kappa Alpha sorority, Xi Pi chapter)
ΑΦΑ (Alpha Phi Alpha fraternity, Xi Pi chapter)
ΔΣΘ (Delta Sigma Theta sorority, Epsilon Nu City-wide chapter)
ΙΦΘ (Iota Phi Theta Fraternity, Beta Upsilon chapter)
ΚΑΨ (Kappa Alpha Psi fraternity, Nu Sigma chapter)
ΩΨΦ (Omega Psi Phi fraternity, Alpha Rho chapter)
ΣΓΡ (Sigma Gamma Rho sorority, Sigma Omicron chapter)
ΦΒΣ (Phi Beta Sigma fraternity, Delta Beta chapter)
ΖΦΒ (Zeta Phi Beta sorority, Tau Mu chapter)

Athletics

The Cal State–East Bay (CSUEB) athletic teams are called the Pioneers. The university is a member of the Division II level of the National Collegiate Athletic Association (NCAA), primarily competing in the California Collegiate Athletic Association (CCAA) for most of their sports since the 2009–10 academic year; while its women's water polo teams compete in the Western Water Polo Association (WWPA). The Pioneers previously competed in the California Pacific Conference (Cal Pac) of the National Association of Intercollegiate Athletics (NAIA) from 1998–99 to 2008–09.

CSUEB competes in 15 intercollegiate varsity sports: Men's sports include baseball, basketball, cross country, golf, soccer and track & field (indoor and outdoor); while women's sports include basketball, cross country, golf, soccer, softball, swimming, track & field (indoor and outdoor), volleyball and water polo.

Mascot
The mascot of the university is the Pioneer. At the inception of the athletic program in 1961 the student body chose an astronaut as the mascot. In the years since, the mascot took a more terrestrial image; first as a frontiersman with a coonskin cap and then as a cowboy named Pioneer Pete. In October 2018, the Pioneer Pete image was retired, although the university retains the concept of students being "Pioneers".

Water polo
The NCAA Women's Water Polo Championship of Effective Division I sports is open to members of all three NCAA divisions and Only East Bay and CSU Monterey Bay from the CCAA participate in the Western Water Polo Association.

Soccer
In 1988 the women's soccer team won the NCAA Division II Women's Soccer Championship. The Pioneers of CSU East Bay has earned 2 NCAA team championships at the Division II level.

Accomplishments
 Women's (1)
 Soccer (1): 1988
 Men's (1)
 Outdoor track and field (1): 1977

Notable people

Alumni

Among the more than 130,000 CSUEB alumni are:
Brian A. Arnold, U.S. Air Force general.
George Barlow, poet
Ted Barrett, an umpire in Major League Baseball
Frank Beede, former Seattle Seahawks offensive lineman and 2010 NFL Teacher of the Year
Mike Bellotti, college football analyst for ESPN television broadcasts
Greg Blankenship, former American football linebacker who played one season in the NFL with the Oakland Raiders and the Pittsburgh Steelers
Sue Burns, an American businesswoman who was the senior general partner (principal owner and largest shareholder) of the San Francisco Giants
Ellen Corbett, a Democratic politician now living in Hayward
Tom Coughlin, former vice chairman of Walmart
Mark Curry, actor and comedian
Natalie Del Conte, co-hosts the technology news podcast Buzz Out Loud
George Fernandez, retired American soccer defender who played professionally in the Major Indoor Soccer League and National Professional Soccer League
Ted Griggs, President of Comcast SportsNet Bay Area
Elihu Harris, Chancellor of the Peralta Community College District, former Oakland City Mayor
Sara M. Harvey, an American costume designer, and an author of clothing history and fiction
J.R. Havlan, comedy writer on The Daily Show with Jon Stewart and recipient of six Emmy Awards for "Outstanding Writing for a Variety, Music or Comedy Program".
 Glenn Henry, computer industry executive and cofounder of Centaur Technology
Eric Hughes, assistant coach, Toronto Raptors and former assistant coach of the Washington Huskies
James Monroe Iglehart, Tony Award-winning actor
Larry Johannessen, NIU English professor
Jay Kleven, Major League Baseball catcher
Suzy Kline, author of children's books series, Horrible Harry and Herbie Jones
Scott Kriens, chairman and CEO of Juniper Networks
Roger Lim, American-Asian actor, director, producer, and screenwriter
Bill Lockyer, former State Attorney General, California State Treasurer
Mark Mastrov, founder of 24 Hour Fitness, part-owner of the Sacramento Kings
Howard McCalebb, African-American abstract sculptor
Farzaneh Milani, Iranian-American scholar and author
Joe Morgan, two-time Sports Emmy Award winner, former Cincinnati Reds great and Hall of Fame second baseman, analyst for ESPN's Sunday Night Baseball
Kristen Morgin, sculptor
Natali Morris, technology news journalist and online media personality
Steven T. Murray, American translator from Swedish, German, Danish, and Norwegian. He has worked under the pseudonyms Reg Keeland and McKinley Burnett when edited into UK English
Louis Navellier, Wall Street icon and trustee of the Cal State East Bay Education Foundation
Susan B. Neuman, prominent educator, researcher, and education policy-maker in early childhood and literacy development
Landon Curt Noll, American computer scientist
Greg Petersen, an American soccer coach
Mario R. Ramil, former Associate Justice of the Hawaii State Supreme Court
Bruce Sagan, mathematics professor at Michigan State University and folk musician
Christopher Seufert, filmmaker
Phil Snow, assistant coach at Eastern Michigan University
Phil Sykes, former college and professional ice hockey player
Chester Lovelle Talton, provisional Bishop of the Episcopal Diocese of San Joaquin in the Episcopal Church
 Nicholas Vasallo, composer, founder of the post-metal group Antagony, film score career, and concert works lecturer for the CSUEB Music Department
Alex Vesia, pitcher for the Los Angeles Dodgers
Timothy P. White, chancellor of the University of California, Riverside
Dawn Monique Williams, American theatre director
Jennifer Wolch, dean of the College of Environmental Design at University of California, Berkeley
Gene Luen Yang, comic book artist

Faculty
 Clayton Bailey, artist, professor emeritus of art
 Larry Bensky, radio show host, lecturer in the communications department
 Stephen D. Gutierrez, professor of English and director of creative writing
 Dave Eshelman, director of jazz studies
 Mel Ramos, professor emeritus of art, noted Pop Art painter
 Dakin Matthews, actor, emeritus professor of English
 John V. Robinson, 2006 Guggenheim Fellow, photographer, and author
 Theodore Roszak, professor emeritus of history and author of the seminal 1968 book, The Making of a Counter Culture
 Raymond Saunders, professor emeritus of art
 Allan Temko, architecture critic, teacher of city planning

References

External links

 
 Official athletics website

 
East Bay
California State University, East Bay
Universities and colleges in Alameda County, California
Schools accredited by the Western Association of Schools and Colleges
Educational institutions established in 1957
1957 establishments in California
Universities and colleges in Contra Costa County, California